Námestie Nežnej revolúcie is a square in the Old Town borough of Bratislava adjacent to the SNP Square in front of the Old Market Hall.

The square was given the name on 15 November 2019 to commemorate the 30 anniversary of the Velvet Revolution. The new name was introduced by the Mayor of Bratislava during a ceremony on 16 November 2019.

References 

Squares in Bratislava